Akka Thamudu is a Telugu language film released on 6 October 1972. It starred Jayalalithaa, A. V. M. Rajan, Muthuraman, R. S. Manohar and Anajali Devi in supporting roles. The bond between the lead heroine Jayalalithaa with the orphaned kid played by Master Sekar was the highlight of the film. The music was provided by T. K. Ramamoorthy. It was directed by Krishnan–Panju and produced by Muthuvel Movies. The film was the dubbed version of Anadhai Anandhan. The Tamil film Anandhai Anandhan and the Hindi film Chanda Aur Bijli were made simultaneously. The Hindi version released earlier in 1969. This Telugu version was a successful film on its release.

Cast
 Jayalalithaa
 A. V. M. Rajan
 R. Muthuraman
 Anjali Devi
 Master Sekhar

Crew
 Director: Krishnan–Panju

Soundtrack
The music was composed by T. K. Ramamoorthy

References

External links
 

1972 films
1970s Telugu-language films
Films directed by Krishnan–Panju
Films scored by M. S. Viswanathan
AVM Productions films
Telugu remakes of Tamil films